Carmine Preziosi (born 8 July 1943) is an Italian former professional road bicycle racer.

Palmarès 

 1962
 1st, Overall, Triptyque Ardennais
 2nd, Stage 2a
 1st, Stage 2b

 1963
 1st, Brussel-Opwijk
 1st, Grand Prix Bodson
 3rd, Omloop der Vlaamse Gewesten, Amateurs
 3rd, Oostakker
 1st, Zellik
 1st, Puteaux

 1964
 2nd, Beringen
 2nd, Brussel-Verviers
 2nd, Stage 8, Critérium du Dauphiné Libéré
 3rd, Kruishoutem
 2nd, Mandel-Leie-Schelde
 3rd, Stage 1, Tour de Luxembourg
 1st, Ferrière-la-Grande
 2nd, Giro di Lombardia

 1965
 1st, Brussel-Verviers
 3rd, Brussel–Ingooigem
 2nd, Stage 7a, Critérium du Dauphiné Libéré
 2nd, GP Monaco
 1st, Genoa–Nice
 1st, Liège–Bastogne–Liège
 1st, Hasselt

 1966
 2nd, GP de Cannes
 1st, Giro dell'Emilia

 1967
 1st, Brussel-Verviers
 2nd, Grand Prix Pino Cerami
 3rd, Hannut
 2nd, Overall, Tirreno–Adriatico
 1st, Overall, Tour of Belgium
 3rd, Stage 1
 1st, Stage 2a
 1st, Denderwindeke

 1968
 1st, GP de Fréjus

References 

Italian male cyclists
1943 births
Living people
Sportspeople from the Province of Avellino
Cyclists from Campania